Park Ji-il (Korean: 박지일, born September 1960) is a South Korean theatre, film and television actor. He is known for his supporting roles in various TV series and films. His better known works are: 2011 TV series The Thorn Birds, 2013 thriller film The Suspect and 2017 historical drama series The Rebel. He has appeared in more than 75 TV series, theatrical plays and films including 2020 political drama film The Man Standing Next. In 2022, he appeared in TV series Artificial City and is appearing in Tracer and Thirty-Nine.

Education

 Graduated from Busan Commercial High School
 Bachelor of Accounting, Dong-A University
 Graduate, School of Drama, Chung-Ang University

Career
Park Ji-il made his theater debut in 1986 with the play Death Fugue. Since then he appeared in stage dramas Crime and Punishment and Mamma Mia among others.

Park debuted on big screen in 1995 with the film My Dear Keum-hong.

In 2021, Park was cast in The National Theater Company's play Angels in America part 1 and part 2, the representative work of American playwright Tony Kushner, Angels in America as Roy Marcus Cohn alongside his son Park Yong-woo, who plays an active role as a former drag queen.

In 2022, Park appeared in TV series Thirty-Nine as adoptive father of Cha Mi-jo, the character portrayed by Son Ye-jin.

Filmography

Films

Television series

Theater

References

External links

 
 Park Ji-il on Play DB
 Park Ji-il on KMDb
 Park Ji-il on Daum 
 

21st-century South Korean male actors
South Korean male television actors
South Korean male film actors 
Living people
1960 births
Chung-Ang University alumni
South Korean stage actors
Dong-a University alumni